Pokhare is a village development committee in Okhaldhunga District in the Sagarmatha Zone of mid-eastern Nepal. At the time of the 1991 Nepal census it had a population of 1790 living in 348 individual households. It is incorporated within Chishankhugadhi Gaupalika.

References

External links
UN map of the municipalities of Okhaldhunga District

Populated places in Okhaldhunga District